The 1913 Louisville Cardinals football team was an American football team that represented the University of Louisville as an independent during the 1913 college football season. In their second season under head coach Lester Larson, the Cardinals compiled a 5–1 record, did not allow a point in their first five games, and outscored all opponents by a total of 257 to 20.  The team played its home games at Eclipse Park in Louisville, Kentucky.

Schedule

References

Louisville
Louisville Cardinals football seasons
Louisville Cardinals football